Edwardes Square is a garden square in Kensington, London, W8. The square was built between 1811 and 1820. 1–23 and 25–48 Edwardes Square are listed Grade II for their architectural merit.

Gardens
The gardens are Grade II* listed on the Register of Historic Parks and Gardens. They are not open to the public.

Notable residents 
 No. 11: the London home of the author and humanist Goldsworthy Lowes Dickinson (1862–1932). 
 No 16: Sir Roger Bannister (the first man to break the four minute mile) lived here.
 No 19: the Italian poet Ugo Foscolo lived here between 1817 and 1818.
 No 27: Comedian Frankie Howerd lived here from 1966 until his death in 1992. 
 No 59: Pianist and composer Helen Pyke lived here in Studio 4, in the mid-1930s.

The Scarsdale Tavern is a pub at no. 23A.

References

1820 establishments in England
Garden squares in London
Grade II listed houses in the Royal Borough of Kensington and Chelsea
Grade II* listed parks and gardens in London
Houses completed in 1820
Kensington
Squares in the Royal Borough of Kensington and Chelsea
Communal gardens